Paul Victor Heffer (born 21 December 1947) is an English former footballer who played as a defender for West Ham United.

Club career
Heffer started as a junior for West Ham United making his professional debut on 18 March 1967 in a 1–0 away defeat to Nottingham Forest. He made only fifteen appearances for West Ham before his footballing career was cut short by injury in 1972. He was awarded a testimonial match on 4 April 1973 in which a West Ham side beat an Israeli side 3–2. Heffer later played semi-professionally with Cambridge City.

Coaching career
Following his playing career, Heffer managed Southend Manor during the 1980s, also taking up a chairman role at the club during the late-1980s before being replaced as chairman by Simon Dibley in 1990. Heffer later returned to West Ham, becoming an academy coach, before making the step up to assistant academy director.

References

1947 births
Living people
Association football defenders
English footballers
English football managers
West Ham United F.C. players
Cambridge City F.C. players
English Football League players
Footballers from West Ham
English football chairmen and investors
Southend Manor F.C. managers
West Ham United F.C. non-playing staff
Association football coaches